The 2019 Liga 1 U-16  (known as the Super Soccer TV Elite Pro Academy Liga 1 U-16 2019 for sponsorship reasons) was the second season of the Liga 1 Elite Pro Academy U-16. The league is currently the youth level (U-16) football league in Indonesia. The season started on 19 April and finished with a final on 6 October 2019.

Persib U16s were the defending champions, but they were eliminated in the second round.

TIRA-Persikabo U16s won the title after defeating Bhayangkara U16s 2–1 in the final.

First round
First round was the group stage and started on 19 April 2019. Group A and B played home and away double-game round-robin tournament while Group C played four-series home tournament with five matches for each series. The winners and runner-ups from each group along with two best third-placed teams advanced to second round.

Group A

Group B

Group C

Ranking of third-placed teams

Second round
Second round was the group stage and was played on 29 September – 2 October 2019. All groups played on a single-game round-robin home tournament. The winners and runner-ups from each group advanced to semi-finals. The draw for the group was held on 24 September 2019.

Group X

|}

Group Y

|}

Knock-out round

Bracket

Semi-finals

Third place

Final

Awards
 Top goalscorers: Rafli Asrul (PSM U16s, 14 goals)
 Best player: Althaf Indie (TIRA-Persikabo U16s)
 Best referee: M. Tri Santoso
 Best coach: Deris Herdiansyah (TIRA-Persikabo U16s)
 Best academy: Persija U16s
 Fair-play team: Arema U16s

References

Liga 1 U-16
Liga 1 U-16
Liga 1 U-16